G27 may refer to:

 , a tanker of the Brazilian Navy
 Gribovsky G-27, a Soviet aircraft
 Glock 27, an Austrian pistol
 Logitech G27, a racing wheel
 Heckler & Koch G27, a German battle rifle
 , a Caldwell-class destroyer of the Royal Navy